"Gummo" (stylized in all caps) is a song recorded by American rapper 6ix9ine, released to digital stores on September 24, 2017. It was released as the lead single from 6ix9ine's debut mixtape Day69 (2018). The single peaked at number 12 on the US Billboard Hot 100. "Gummo" was certified Gold by the RIAA on January 11, 2018, and then Platinum on March 5 with the song reaching two million copies sold.

The official remix features a guest appearance by Offset and is also included on the Day69 mixtape. A remix by Lil Wayne featuring Gudda Gudda appears on the Dedication 6: Reloaded mixtape hosted by DJ Drama.

Controversy
The beat was produced by Pi'erre Bourne, and was originally intended for Trippie Redd. However, Trippie Redd instead gave the beat to 6ix9ine, who made it into a diss track aimed at Trippie Redd and SosMula.

Commercial performance
"Gummo" debuted at number 58 on the Billboard Hot 100 for the week of December 2, 2017. It peaked at number 12 the week of December 30, remaining on the chart for twenty weeks. In Canada, the song debuted at number 72 on the Canadian Hot 100 the same week it first appeared on the Billboard Hot 100. It peaked at number 32 the week of March 10 and remained on the chart for twenty weeks.

Music video
The music video was released on YouTube alongside digital releases. Official audio for the song was released on SoundCloud later. The music video, which features 6ix9ine in Bed-Stuy, Brooklyn, New York, also features various members of the Bloods street gang. As of October 2021, it has over 400 million views.

Remix
The official remix features Offset. The remix is also an included track on the Day69 mixtape.

Omelly, Rick Ross and Rico Recklezz have made their own remixes to the song.

Charts

Weekly charts

Year-end charts

Certifications

References

2017 singles
2017 songs
6ix9ine songs
Songs written by 6ix9ine
Songs written by Pi'erre Bourne